Disband (stylized as disBand) is a Canadian reality show that was produced and broadcast by MuchMusic that gave aspiring music acts a chance to get big industry attention. It was hosted by either Sarah Taylor or Devon Soltendieck and was usually narrated by the lead singer of the featured band.

Overview
Each episode featured a band that was coached by a music industry veteran and at the end performed for a panel of judges. Greig Nori "The Guru" had made appearances as an adviser, and Ralph James, Jennifer Hirst, Colin Lewis, JDiggz, Hannah Simone, Mark Spicoluk, Katie Clark, and Matt Wells had appeared as judges.

Each episode was in 7 different segments, for each day of the week leading up until Sunday, their performance day at MuchMusic Headquarters. The segments followed what the band experiences on each day, starting on Sunday. At the beginning of the episode, the band was introduced along with all of its members. The episode was usually narrated by the lead singer, although other members had done so as well.

In most cases, Greig would surprise them and arrange for them to meet up, where he would then begin coaching them. The bands would then take part in various activities such as photo shoots, meeting record labels, interviews, or writing new songs, throughout the week.  Most episodes also featured the band visiting a local Toronto recording studio, such as Number 9 Audio Group or The Decibel House, for a recording session with a professional engineer.  By the end of the week, they would have to perform amongst a panel of judges and an audience.

After their performance, they would head into a green room where Greig would be waiting for them. Back in the main room, the judges would deliberate and decide whether or not the band had a possibility of getting signed. However, the decision was not affected by the audience's wishes. The band would then go back into the main room, where the host would then summarize the judges' thoughts, mentioning both pros and cons of the band.  After the verdict, the episode ended with the band either going back home, or got ready to take on a next step.

Episodes

Season One

Season Two

DisBand Successes

Stereos - Signed to Universal Music Canada & # 1 Song on iTunes (Summer Girl)
Dean Lickyer - Signed to Underground Operations
Abandon All Ships - Signed to Underground Operations, Rise Records and Velocity Records
San Sebastian- Signed to Universal Music Canada
These Kids Wear Crowns - Signed to EMI Music Canada / Capitol Records

Maddy Rodriguez: Nettwerk One Publishing

Mean Tangerine - Signed To Drive Records/Fontana North

Spin off
A spin-off series, entitled disBand Discovered began in 2011. The series premiered on August 16, 2011. The series follows six bands trying to make it in the industry, over the course of 6 months. MuchMusic has described the series as a "rock documentary". The show features six bands; Nightbox, Colorsound, For The Weekend, Brighter Brightest, Brett Boivin, Maddy Rodriguez and Slow Motion Victory.  At the end of the season, the six bands go to Showcase Day at the MuchMusic Headquarters, where they are judged by several record producers serving as judges. The series is still hosted by Greig Nori.

The first season of the series began on August 16, 2011, and finished on October 28, 2011, and aired for a total of 10 episodes.

After the series, For The Weekend released a single called Rockstar and fired one of their members. Slow Motion Victory released an EP "The War Inside", collaborated with Coca-Cola to write a song for their Open Happiness campaign, and are still making music. Nightbox was signed, and is currently on tour, and are going to be an opening act for Lights on tour. Brett Boivin graduated from high school and released an EP. Colorsound was also signed, and is currently working on their second album, while Brighter Brightest released their debut album, Right For Me.

References

External links
Official Homepage

Much (TV channel) original programming
2000s Canadian music television series